XHMON-FM is a radio station on 89.3 FM in Monterrey, Nuevo León, Mexico. It carries Radio Fórmula programming.

History
XEMON-AM received its concession on November 29, 1988. It was owned by Radio Color, S.A., a subsidiary of Radiorama, and was sold to Radio Fórmula in the person of Rogerio Mariano Azcárraga Madero in 1997.

In April 2018, XEMON-AM conducted its second-wave migration to FM as XHMON-FM 89.3. The station broadcasts in HD Radio and offers four subchannels, including feeds of XEACH-AM and XEIZ-AM and the Trión musical format.

References

Mass media in Monterrey
Radio Fórmula